Mamfe Airport  is a public use airport located  south of Mamfe, Sud-Ouest, Cameroon. The Cameroon military base in Besongabang shares the airport.

See also
List of airports in Cameroon

References 

 OurAirports - Mamfe

External links 
 Airport record for Mamfe Airport at Landings.com
 Geographical Names at Geographic.com

Airports in Cameroon
Southwest Region (Cameroon)